René Vandenberghe (5 March 1887 – 3 July 1958) was a Belgian road cyclist. Professional from 1909 to 1921, he won the Tour of Belgium in 1911. He also rode in the Tour de France four times, with his best result being 12th in 1912. That year, he also finished 2nd in two stages and 3rd in two stages of the race.

Major results

1908
 4th Liège–Bastogne–Liège
1909
 1st Stage 1 Tour of Belgium
 4th Kampioenschap van Vlaanderen
1910
 1st Stage 1 Tour of Belgium
 6th Paris–Roubaix
1911
 1st Overall Tour of Belgium
1st Stages 2, 3, 5, 6 & 7
 5th Paris–Roubaix
 9th Paris–Tours
1912
 1st Six Days of Brussels (with Octave Lapize)
1913
 3rd Bordeaux–Paris
 4th Paris–Tours
 6th Overall Tour of Belgium
1st Stage 5
1914
 10th Paris–Tours
1915
 2nd Six Days of Brussels

References

External links

1887 births
1958 deaths
Belgian male cyclists
Cyclists from West Flanders